Was it something that I didn't say? is the eighth studio album by Argentine singer Pablo Ruiz. It was released in 1999.

Track listing 

 Conmigo Volarás
 The Love Of Your Life
 Lost Without You
 All That You Want
 I Won't Let You Down
 I Can't Get Over You
 El Deseo De Ti
 Just Let Me Go
 Agua De Manantial
 Por Ti
 Just For Tonight
 Indecible
 Was It Something That I Didn't Say?
 El Deseo De Ti (Banda version) (Bonus track)

References 

Pablo Ruiz (singer) albums
1999 albums